Christie Johnstone is a 1921 British silent romance film directed by Norman McDonald and starring Gertrude McCoy, Stewart Rome and Clive Brook. It was adapted from the 1853 novel Christie Johnstone by Charles Reade. It was made at Broadwest's Walthamstow Studios.

Cast
 Gertrude McCoy ...  Christie Johnstone 
 Stewart Rome ...  Viscount Ipsden 
 Clive Brook ...  Astral Hither 
 Mercy Hatton ...  Lady Barbara Sinclair 
 J. Denton-Thompson ...  Wully 
 Peggy Hathaway ...  Jean 
 Adeline Hayden Coffin ...  Mrs. Gatty 
 Gordon Craig ...  Charles Gatty 
 Dorothy Vernon ...  Widow McKay 
 Tom Beaumont ...  Saunders

References

External links

1921 films
British romance films
Films based on British novels
Films set in England
British silent feature films
British black-and-white films
1920s romance films
1920s English-language films
1920s British films